Rondebosch Boys' Preparatory School is a state primary school in Rondebosch, a suburb of Cape Town, South Africa. It was detached from Rondebosch Boys' High School and established as a separate school in 1929.

History
The first headmaster, Robert Ramage, took up this position on 1 February 1897 with the school having eight pupils from standards 2 to 7. Faced with a flush of applications from local residents, a junior department was opened, and a one-acre plot of ground, "The Firs", at the corner of Campground and Rouwkoop Roads was purchased for £1900.

New school buildings were erected and teaching began there in September 1898. Two years later Ramage bought a local property which had been named Canigou Estate after an imposing monastery located high in the Pyrenees. This became a school hostel.

The school flourished and, by 1927, had an enrollment of 568 boys. The school's first headmaster, WH "Papa" Law (1930-1943), was a Yorkshireman who was previously head of the large Tembuland Teachers' Training College where Nelson Mandela once studied.

He was followed by JCR Enslin (1943-1966) who guided the school through its change of site in 1948. The next incumbent was RD Holmes (1967-1972), who remained at the helm until his appointment to the inspectorate. He was succeeded by former staff member DM Laidlaw (1972-1987), an ex-RAF pilot, whose innovations included a science room, a computer centre and a 'Magnet' class for extending the brighter senior pupils.

Bruce Lane (1987-1997), the fifth headmaster, oversaw the major renovations which were completed in 1994. He was headmaster in the centenary year of 1997.

Tony Ryan was the headmaster between (1998-2018). The current headmaster is Ian Ryan.

Information and communication technology 
The Computer Centre is equipped with 30 Microsoft computers in a computer laboratory, as well as a total of 180 computers throughout the school, with at least a computer in each class.  A laptop/tablet trolley goes to each class. All teachers use the Microsoft 360 Cloud and the learners use Google Apps for their work.   Every boy comes to computers every week for one hour from Grades three to seven and half an hour for Grades one and two.  Every boy has his own computer during the computer classes.

Each boy has Internet access, as well as their own e-mail address on the rbps.co.za domain.

There are data projectors in many classes, as well as an interactive whiteboard.  The board is connected to a computer and then the two devices communicate interchangeably. The teachers project their notes and slide shows onto these boards and instead of becoming a one-sided lecture, it becomes a two-sided experience. Students can edit and make notes on the screen or answer questions directly on the screen.

Notable alumni
 Tim Jenkin, political prisoner, author, escapee from Pretoria Central Prison

External links
 Rondebosch Boys website
 Rondebosch Boys' Preparatory School

References

Boys' schools in South Africa
Schools in Cape Town
Educational institutions established in 1929
Primary schools in South Africa
1929 establishments in South Africa
Rondebosch